was a Japanese football player. He played for Japan national team.

Club career
Ichihashi was born in Hyogo Prefecture on June 9, 1909. He played for Keio BRB was consisted of his alma mater Keio University players and graduates.

National team career
In May 1930, when Ichihashi was a Keio University student, he was selected Japan national team for 1930 Far Eastern Championship Games in Tokyo and Japan won the championship. At this competition, on May 25, he debuted and scored a goal against Philippines. On May 29, he also played against Republic of China. He played 2 games and scored 1 goals for Japan in 1930.

National team statistics

References

External links
 
 Japan National Football Team Database

1909 births
Year of death missing
Keio University alumni
Association football people from Hyōgo Prefecture
Japanese footballers
Japan international footballers
Association football forwards